James Patrick Boyd (born June 4, 1949) is a Canadian former professional ice hockey player.

Boyd played three seasons (1974 – 1977) in the World Hockey Association (WHA) with the Phoenix Roadrunners and Calgary Cowboys, scoring He 49 goals and 80 assists for 129 point, while earning 68 penalty minutes, in 169 WHA games played.

References

External links

1949 births
Living people
Amarillo Wranglers players
Calgary Cowboys players
Canadian ice hockey forwards
Fort Wayne Komets players
Graz 99ers players
Oklahoma City Blazers (1965–1977) players
Phoenix Roadrunners (WHA) players
Phoenix Roadrunners (WHL) players
Ice hockey people from Calgary
Wisconsin Badgers men's ice hockey players
Canadian expatriate ice hockey players in Austria
Canadian expatriate ice hockey players in the United States